Abidali Neemuchwala (born 8 December 1967) is an Indian business executive. He was the chief executive officer (CEO) and managing director (MD) of Wipro from February 2016 to June 2020. On 31 January 2020, Wipro announced that he would be stepping down due to family commitments, once a successor is appointed.

Neemuchwala, who had been group president and chief operating officer (COO) of Wipro from April 2015, was appointed CEO with effect from 1 February 2016. He previously was the CEO of the BPO division of Tata Consultancy Services Limited.

Education 
Neemuchwala has a bachelor's in engineering (BE) degree in Electronics and Communication Engineering from National Institute of Technology, Raipur, and a master's degree in Industrial Management from the Indian Institute of Technology, Bombay.

Career

TCS 
Neemuchwala joined Tata Consultancy Services (TCS) in 1992 after graduating from IIT Bombay and worked there for 23 years, rising to the head of business process services. Mentored by the then TCS CEO and current chairman of Tata Sons, Natarajan Chandrasekaran, Neemuchwala was instrumental in turning around the fortunes of TCS BPO. His working style is often compared to that of Chandrasekaran. He was awarded the BPO CEO of the Year in 2010 and 2012. At TCS, Neemuchwala was responsible for over 12 percent of the company's revenues. He was honoured by the Shared Services Organisation of IPQC for his contribution to the industry.

Wipro 
Neemuchwala was appointed group president and COO in April 2015. As the COO, Neemuchwala spear headed several initiatives that helped create a more nimble and agile organization, and accelerated Wipro's ability to not only respond to customers in the digital age, but also ensure deeper employee engagement. On 1 February 2016, he was appointed CEO and executive director of Wipro succeeding T.K. Kurien. As CEO, Neemuchwala oversees $8 billion in revenue and more than 160,000 employees serving clients across six continents. In September 2018, Neemuchwala helped land Wipro its largest deal ever with a $1.5 billion, 10-year contract with Alight Solutions. In July 2019, he was appointed managing director (MD) of Wipro following the retirement of Azim Premji. He is on the board of directors of Wipro Limited and the World Affairs Council of Dallas Fort Worth. He sits on the CEO Council of the Texas Economic Development Corporation.

On 31 January 2020, Wipro announced that Neemuchwala would be stepping down due to family commitments, once a successor is appointed.

On 30 May 2020, Wipro appointed former Capgemini COO Thierry Delaporte as its CEO.

Recognitions
Neemuchwala has been recognized with multiple industry awards and sits on boards of industry and community forums such as the World Affairs Council of Dallas Fort Worth. He has been recently appointed on the Board of Texas Economic Development Corporation and is also a member of its CEO Council. He is very passionate about community service and champions diversity and inclusion in the workplace.

Personal life 
Neemuchwala gets his surname from his hometown of Neemuch, a town in Madhya Pradesh. He grew up in Delhi, Neemuch, and Mumbai. He enjoys travelling, Indian music, reading fiction, and playing golf. He is married, has three children, and lives in Dallas, Texas.

References

1967 births
Indian Muslims
Indian chief executives
Living people
IIT Bombay alumni
National Institute of Technology, Raipur alumni
People from Neemuch